Scott Hendricks (born July 26, 1956) is an American record producer who has produced over 30 country music artists. His productions have garnered 121 Top 10s, and 78 Number One hits. Between 1995 and 1997, he was President and Chief Executive Officer of Capitol Records Nashville. Between 1998 and 2001 he served as President and CEO of Virgin Nashville. He now serves as Warner Music Nashville's Executive Vice President of A&R. Acts for whom Hendricks has produced include Restless Heart,  John Michael Montgomery, Brooks & Dunn, Trace Adkins, Alan Jackson, Faith Hill, Blake Shelton, Jana Kramer, Dan + Shay, Michael Ray, William Michael Morgan, Drew Parker and Tegan Marie.

Biography
Scott Hendricks was born in Clinton, Oklahoma. While attending Oklahoma State University, Hendricks met Tim DuBois (who later would serve as President of Arista Nashville) and Greg Jennings (who later became a member of the band Restless Heart). Hendricks moved to Nashville, Tennessee in 1978, first working as an engineer in a studio owned by Tompall & the Glaser Brothers with legendary producer Jimmy Bowen. Hendricks would also assist producer Barry Beckett in his work with Hank Williams Jr., Alabama, Etta James, and many others.

His first work as a producer came in 1985 when he and DuBois co-produced Restless Heart's debut album. Over the next decade he produced several artists, such as Alan Jackson, Brooks and Dunn, Trace Adkins, Faith Hill, John Michael Montgomery, Steve Wariner, and Suzy Bogguss. In 1991 he founded the music publishing company Big Tractor, whose writers penned “I Saw God Today” for George Strait and “Amazed” for Lonestar.

In 1995, Hendricks was hired as President and CEO of Capitol Records Nashville. There, he oversaw the careers of Garth Brooks and Deana Carter as well as signing Keith Urban, and Trace Adkins.

Hendricks exited Capitol in 1997 and took over as President and CEO of Virgin Records' Nashville division; where he served from its establishment in 1998 until its dissolution in 2001. He then returned to his independent work as a producer. In 2007, Hendricks joined Warner Music Nashville as the Senior Vice President of A&R.

In addition to his A&R duties at Warner, Hendricks’ producing efforts have been instrumental in Blake Shelton's ascent from mid-level act to bona fide star with twenty-seven No. 1 singles, including “Hillbilly Bone,” a duet with Trace Adkins which won an ACM Award for Best Collaboration in 2011.

In April of 2014, Hendricks was promoted to Executive Vice President of A&R at Warner Music Nashville.

Hendricks was inducted into the Oklahoma State University Hall of Fame in 2000 and the Oklahoma Music Hall of Fame in 2015. He was inducted by Blake Shelton into Oklahoma's highest honor, the Oklahoma Hall of Fame in 2021.

Number One Singles Produced

Top Ten Singles Produced

References

1956 births
American country record producers
Living people
People from Clinton, Oklahoma